Creative GigaWorks ProGamer G500 is a 5.1 speaker system by Creative Technology aimed at computer gamers. It features five 3 inch, 36 watt RMS satellites, and an 8 inch 130 watt RMS subwoofer with dual ports. It puts out 310 watts RMS power, and 620 watts peak power. The subwoofer has an integrated amplifier. It includes a wired remote control that allows the user to change amplitude levels for center, rear, and subwoofer speakers, and adjust the treble.

The system can also be muted, put it into standby, or plug in headphones from/with the remote. The G500 also features an upmixing feature, to create a 5.1 sound field from a 2.0 stereo input, switchable from the remote.  The frequency response range of the G500 is 35–20,000 Hz, with a SNR of 85 dB. It is tuned for low end punch, so it does not produce extremely crisp high notes, but it is understandable, considering the target audience.

References

Creative Technology products
Sound cards